Mount Babel is a mountain peak of the Bow Range in Banff National Park, Alberta, Canada. The mountain can be seen from the Valley of the Ten Peaks.

Mount Babel was first climbed by A Hart, Edward Oliver Wheeler, L. Wilson and H. Worsfold in 1910.

Geology
Like other mountains in Banff Park, Mount Babel is composed of sedimentary rock laid down during the Precambrian to Jurassic periods. Formed in shallow seas, this sedimentary rock was pushed east and over the top of younger rock during the Laramide orogeny.

Climate
Based on the Köppen climate classification, Mount Babel is located in a subarctic climate with cold, snowy winters, and mild summers. Temperatures can drop below −20 °C with wind chill factors below −30 °C.

Tower of Babel
The Tower of Babel is a conspicuous quartzite monolith at the northern end of the mountain, and is apparent to park visitors at Moraine Lake. It was named in 1899 by Walter D. Wilcox because its profile reminded him of the biblical Tower of Babel. The first ascent of the tower was made in 1959 by G. Boles, B. Greenwood, and A. Washington.

See also
 Geology of the Rocky Mountains
 List of mountains in the Canadian Rockies

References

Further reading

Gallery

External links
 Parks Canada web site: Banff National Park
 Weather: Mount Babel

Three-thousanders of Alberta
Mountains of Banff National Park
Canadian Rockies